Croatoan may refer to:

Croatoan Island (now Hatteras Island) on the Outer Banks of North Carolina
Croatan tribe, alternately spelled "Croatoan"
The word "Croatoan", found carved into a tree on Roanoke Island at the site of the Lost Colony in 1590
"Croatoan" (Ellison), a 1975 short story by Harlan Ellison 
"Croatoan" (Supernatural), an episode of the U.S. television series
Croatoan, a character in the Syfy series Haven played by William Shatner

See also
Croatan (disambiguation)
Croatian (disambiguation)